Emilio Estevez Tsai (Chinese: 蔡立靖 Tsai Li-ching; born 10 August 1998) is a professional footballer who currently plays as a midfielder for Hong Kong Premier League club Eastern. Born in Canada, Estevez represents Chinese Taipei internationally.

Early life
Estevez began playing youth soccer with the Etobicoke Energy before switching to Clarkson SC in Mississauga as well as playing futsal. In 2016, when he was 18, he spent a year training with the lower teams of La Liga club Levante. He then spent a week on trial with Queen's Park Rangers before returning to Canada. 

In 2017, he attended Sheridan College, making seven appearances and scoring one goal for the Bruins.

Club career

Early career
In 2018, Estevez played for League1 Ontario side North Mississauga SC, making eight appearances in league play. He also played in the Canadian Soccer League with SC Waterloo Region.

York9
In October 2018, Estevez participated in the Canadian Premier League Open Trials in Toronto, where he was highly rated by scouts. On 8 February 2019, Estevez signed with CPL side York9. On 4 May 2019, he made his professional debut as a starter in a match against Cavalry FC and assisted York's lone goal in a 2–1 loss. Estevez scored his first goal for York on 27 July against HFX Wanderers, netting the final goal in a 6–2 victory.

On 10 December 2019, it was announced that Estevez had re-signed for the upcoming season.

ADO Den Haag
On 12 May 2020, York9 announced the sale of Estevez to Dutch Eredivisie club ADO Den Haag for an initial fee in the range of $100,000 CAD, plus add-ons and a sell on clause. He agreed to a one-year contract with the club, with an option to extend for a further year.

Estevez became the first player to move from the Canadian Premier League to a top-flight club in Europe, and was to be the first ever Taiwanese player to ply his trade in the Dutch Eredivisie, and the third overall to play in a top European League. He made his first appearance in a pre-season friendly against Almere City FC on 8 August, playing the second half. Initially joining the first team, he was moved to begin the season with the U21 side. On 29 January 2021, he and the club agreed to terminate his contract by mutual consent, after he appeared in only two substitute appearances for the U21 side.

Ourense CF
In 2021, he joined Ourense CF, playing in the Spanish fourth tier Tercera División. After departing Spain, he returned to Canada and trained (but did not sign) with his former club York United FC (who had since changed their name from York9 FC).

Eastern
In the summer of 2022, he trained with China League One side Guangxi Pingguo. In October 2022, Estevez signed a contract with Hong Kong Premier League club Eastern. He made his debut on 16 October against Resources Capital FC. He scored his first goal on 23 October in a 3-1 Hong Kong Senior Challenge Shield match, also against Resources Capital FC.
He scored his first league goal in a match against Sham Shui Po on 29 October 2022.

International career
Born in Toronto to a Spanish father and a Taiwanese Hakka mother, Estevez was eligible to represent Canada, Chinese Taipei or Spain internationally.

In 2018, Estevez was invited to train with the Chinese Taipei national team. In February 2019, shortly after signing for York9, Estevez received another call-up from Chinese Taipei for a friendly against the Solomon Islands, but did not appear in the match due to injury. He made his debut as a starter in their loss to Australia during 2022 FIFA World Cup qualification on 15 October 2019.

Personal life
Despite the similarity in name to actor Emilio Estevez, he was actually named after former Real Madrid player Emilio Butragueño.

Career statistics

Club

References

External links

Emilio Estevez Tsai at La Preferente

1998 births
Living people
Association football midfielders
Soccer players from Toronto
People with acquired Taiwanese citizenship
Taiwanese footballers
Canadian soccer players
Taiwanese people of Spanish descent
Canadian people of Spanish descent
Canadian people of Taiwanese descent
Taiwanese expatriate footballers
Canadian expatriate soccer players
Expatriate footballers in the Netherlands
Expatriate footballers in Hong Kong
Taiwanese expatriates in the Netherlands
Canadian expatriate sportspeople in the Netherlands
Sheridan College alumni
North Mississauga SC players
SC Waterloo Region players
York United FC players
ADO Den Haag players
CD Ourense footballers
Eastern Sports Club footballers
League1 Ontario players
Canadian Soccer League (1998–present) players
Canadian Premier League players
Eredivisie players
Tercera División players
Hong Kong Premier League players
Chinese Taipei international footballers